Burmese New Zealanders refers to New Zealand citizens of Burmese descent or a Burma (Myanmar)-born person who resides in New Zealand. Most Burmese New Zealanders arrived in New Zealand in the 1980s.

See also

 Asian New Zealanders
 Burmese diaspora
 Burmese Australians

References

Asian New Zealander
New Zealand